The following lists events that happened during 2010 in the Great Socialist People's Libyan Arab Jamahiriya.

Incumbents
President: Muammar Gaddafi
Prime Minister: Baghdadi Mahmudi

Events

February
 February 7 - Libya bans YouTube and other news websites in a crackdown of controversial topics, including human rights abuses by the Gaddafi government.

References

 
Years of the 21st century in Libya
Libya
Libya
2010s in Libya